Mount Tolmie, elevation , is a hill and surrounding neighbourhood in Saanich, Greater Victoria, British Columbia. It is located on the ancestral lands of the Saanich and Songhees people.  The majority of the mountain forms Mount Tolmie Park, a municipal park, while the south side has several private residences. The peak of the hill is known for its excellent views of Victoria, the Olympic Mountains, and the San Juan Islands.

Name 
The hill is named for William Fraser Tolmie, a Scottish surgeon, fur trader, scientist, and politician employed by the Hudson's Bay Company. In 1859 Tolmie was transferred to Fort Victoria. He was later elected to the Legislative Assembly of Vancouver Island, the elected body of the Colony of Vancouver Island.

Geology 

Although there are volcanic peaks in the Pacific Northwest such as Mount Baker and Mount Rainier, Mount Tolmie is composed of sedimentary rocks formed in the Cretaceous period about 100 million years ago, as is its nearby larger sibling Mount Douglas.

The neighbourhood
The namesake neighbourhood around the base of Mt. Tolmie is primarily residential, roughly bounded by McKenzie Avenue, Cedar Hill Road, McRae Avenue, Camosun College Lansdowne Campus, and the Henderson neighbourhood of Oak Bay Municipality.

References

External links
Description of the park from the Saanich municipal website
Mount Tolmie Community Association

Tolmie
Neighbourhoods in Saanich, British Columbia